The prime minister of Solomon Islands is Solomon Islands' head of government, consequent on being the leader of the party or coalition with majority support in the National Parliament. Since April 2019, the prime minister has been Manasseh Sogavare.

Solomon Islands is a Commonwealth realm; the functions of the head of state are performed on behalf of the monarch of Solomon Islands by the governor-general of Solomon Islands, who is nominated by Parliament.

The prime minister's official residence is Red House in Honiara.

List of prime ministers of Solomon Islands (1978–present)

See also
 Deputy Prime Minister of Solomon Islands
 Governor-General of Solomon Islands
 Leader of the Opposition (Solomon Islands)
 Leader of the Independent Members

References

Solomon Islands, List of Prime Ministers of
 
1978 establishments in the Solomon Islands
Solomon Islands politics-related lists
Lists of Solomon Islands people